The 2001–02 Bangladeshi cricket season featured the inaugural Test series in Bangladesh between Bangladesh and Zimbabwe, followed by a series against Pakistan.

International tours

Zimbabwean cricket team in Bangladesh

Bangladesh hosted Zimbabwe for a 2 Test and 3 One Day International tour in November 2001 before travelling to New Zealand in December 2001 for a 2 Test series. Zimbabwe won four out of the five matches with one of the Test matches resulting in a draw.

Pakistani cricket team in Bangladesh

Pakistan played 3 first-class matches, including 2 Tests; and 3 One Day Internationals.  Pakistan won the Test series convincingly, winning both matches by an innings:
 1st Test at Bangabandhu National Stadium, Dhaka – Pakistan won by an innings and 178 runs
 2nd Test at MA Aziz Stadium, Chittagong – Pakistan won by an innings and 169 runs

Domestic competitions

Honours

National Cricket League

National Cricket One-Day League

Other matches

See also
 History of cricket in Bangladesh

References

Further reading
 Wisden Cricketers' Almanack 2003

2001 in Bangladeshi cricket
2002 in Bangladeshi cricket
Bangladeshi cricket seasons from 2000–01
Domestic cricket competitions in 2001–02